The men's freestyle 86 kg is a competition featured at the Golden Grand Prix Ivan Yarygin 2018, and was held in Krasnoyarsk, Russia on the 28th of January.

Medalists

Results
Legend
F — Won by fall

Final

Top half
qualification: Alikhan Dzhabrailov of Chechnya vs Artur Naifonov of North Ossetia-Alania def. (0–3)
qualification: Dauren Kurugliev of Dagestan def Soslan Ktsoev of North Ossetia-Alania (7–0)

Section 1

Bottom half

Section 2

Repechage

References

Men's freestyle 86 kg